Gerald FitzGerald, 5th Duke of Leinster (16 August 1851 – 1 December 1893) was an Anglo-Irish peer.

Biography
Leinster was born in Dublin, Ireland, the son of The 4th Duke of Leinster and Lady Caroline Sutherland-Leveson-Gower.

He married Lady Hermione Wilhelmina Duncombe (30 March 1864 – Mentone, France, 19 March 1895), daughter of The 1st Earl of Feversham, in London on 17 January 1884. It was not a happy marriage. She died of tuberculosis at age 30.

The Leinsters had the following children:
 Maurice FitzGerald, 6th Duke of Leinster (1 March 1887 – 4 February 1922)
 Major Lord Desmond FitzGerald (21 September 1888 – 3 March 1916), presumed KIA in the World War I
 Edward FitzGerald, 7th Duke of Leinster (6 May 1892 – 8 March 1976), whose alleged biological father was Hugo Charteris, 11th Earl of Wemyss.

After the 5th Duke's death of typhoid fever, his stamp collection, which contained around ten thousand pieces, was bequeathed to the Dublin Museum of Science and Art. It included an Inverted Swan which he had discovered was inverted years after he took possession of it.

Ancestry

Notes

Sources and references

External links
"DNA test the latest twist in aristocratic tale of a cowboy, a gambler and a web of deceit", Scotsman, 4 November 2010

Gerald
FitzGerald
1851 births
1893 deaths
High Sheriffs of Kildare
Members of the Privy Council of Ireland
Fathers of philately
Dukes of Leinster (1766)